Joel R. Primack (born July 14, 1945) is a professor of physics and astrophysics at the University of California, Santa Cruz and is a member of the Santa Cruz Institute for Particle Physics.

Primack received his A.B. from Princeton University in 1966 and his Ph.D. from Stanford University in 1970. His fields of study are relativistic quantum field theory, cosmology, and particle astrophysics. He is also involved in supercomputer simulations of dark matter models. He directs the University of California High-Performance AstroComputing Center (UC-HiPACC). Primack is best known for his co-authorship with George Blumenthal, Sandra Moore Faber, and Martin Rees of the theory of cold dark matter (CDM) in 1984. He co-authored two books with Nancy Abrams, The View from the Center of the Universe (2006) and The New Universe and the Human Future (2011). He played main roles in starting the Congressional Science and Technology Fellowship program, the Forum on Physics and Society of the American Physical Society, and the Science and Human Rights program of the American Association for the Advancement of Science in 1970-1973. He is a fellow of the American Physical Society and the American Association for the Advancement of Science.

References

External links
 The Terry Lectures 2009 - Yale University - first of four lectures on cosmology by Joel Primack and Nancy Abrams.

American astronomers
Lick Observatory
University of California, Santa Cruz faculty
Stanford University alumni
Living people
1945 births